The Kenya Fed Cup team represents Kenya in Fed Cup tennis competition and are governed by the Kenya Lawn Tennis Association.  They have not competed since 2005.

History
Kenya competed in its first Fed Cup in 1991.  They have won two of 25 ties all-time (vs. Cyprus in 1995 and 2005).

See also
Fed Cup
Kenya Davis Cup team

External links

Billie Jean King Cup teams
Fed Cup
Fed Cup